Boltenia ovifera is a species of ascidian tunicates in the family Pyuridae. It is found in the Arctic to the South of Cape Cod.

References 

 Boltenia ovifera at WoRMS

Stolidobranchia
Animals described in 1767
Taxa named by Carl Linnaeus